Communauté d'agglomération de Béthune-Bruay, Artois-Lys Romane is the communauté d'agglomération, an intercommunal structure, centred on the cities of Béthune and Bruay-la-Buissière. It is located in the Pas-de-Calais department, in the Hauts-de-France regions, northern France. It was created in January 2017 by the merger of the former communauté d'agglomération de Béthune Bruay Nœux et environs and the former communautés de communes Artois-Lys and Artois-Flandres. Its area is 645.6 km2. Its population was 276,759 in 2018.

Composition
The communauté d'agglomération consists of the following 100 communes:

Allouagne
Ames
Amettes
Annequin
Annezin
Auchel
Auchy-au-Bois
Auchy-les-Mines
Bajus
Barlin
Béthune
Beugin
Beuvry
Billy-Berclau
Blessy
Bourecq
Bruay-la-Buissière
Burbure
Busnes
Calonne-Ricouart
Calonne-sur-la-Lys
Camblain-Châtelain
Cambrin
Cauchy-à-la-Tour
Caucourt
Chocques
La Comté
La Couture
Cuinchy
Diéval
Divion
Douvrin
Drouvin-le-Marais
Ecquedecques
Essars
Estrée-Blanche
Estrée-Cauchy
Ferfay
Festubert
Fouquereuil
Fouquières-lès-Béthune
Fresnicourt-le-Dolmen
Gauchin-Légal
Givenchy-lès-la-Bassée
Gonnehem
Gosnay
Guarbecque
Haillicourt
Haisnes
Ham-en-Artois
Hermin
Hersin-Coupigny
Hesdigneul-lès-Béthune
Hinges
Houchin
Houdain
Isbergues
Labeuvrière
Labourse
Lambres
Lapugnoy
Lespesses
Lières
Liettres
Ligny-lès-Aire
Lillers
Linghem
Locon
Lorgies
Lozinghem
Maisnil-lès-Ruitz
Marles-les-Mines
Mazinghem
Mont-Bernanchon
Neuve-Chapelle
Nœux-les-Mines
Norrent-Fontes
Noyelles-lès-Vermelles
Oblinghem
Ourton
Quernes
Rebreuve-Ranchicourt
Rely
Richebourg
Robecq
Rombly
Ruitz
Sailly-Labourse
Saint-Floris
Saint-Hilaire-Cottes
Saint-Venant
Vaudricourt
Vendin-lès-Béthune
Vermelles
Verquigneul
Verquin
Vieille-Chapelle
Violaines
Westrehem
Witternesse

References

Bethune-Bruay
Bethune-Bruay